Matsuzaka(松坂) may refer to:

People
 Daisuke Matsuzaka, Japanese baseball player
 Keiko Matsuzaka, Japanese actress
 Teruhisa Matsusaka, Japanese-American mathematician

Places
 Matsusaka, a Japanese city in the Mie Prefecture

Buildings
 Matsuzaka Castle, Matsuzaka, Japan
 Matsusaka Station, Matsuzaka, Japan
 Higashi-Matsusaka Station, Matsuzaka, Japan

Education
 "Matsuka University", better known as Mie Chukyo University

Food
 Matsusaka beef, a brand of wagyu beef

Japanese-language surnames